North Dakota Highway 37 (ND 37) is a  east–west state highway in the U.S. state of North Dakota. ND 37's western terminus is at ND 23 and ND 1804 north of Parshall, and the eastern terminus is at U.S. Route 83 (US 83) and ND 1804 east of Garrison.

Major intersections

References

037
Transportation in Mountrail County, North Dakota
Transportation in McLean County, North Dakota